Andrew Paul McAfee (born ), a principal research scientist at MIT, is cofounder and codirector of the MIT Initiative on the Digital Economy at the MIT Sloan School of Management. He studies how digital technologies are changing the world.

Life and work 
McAfee is the author of Enterprise 2.0, published in November 2009 by Harvard Business School Press, and co-author of Race Against the Machine with Erik Brynjolfsson. In 2014, this work was expanded into the book The Second Machine Age.

He speaks frequently to both academic and industry audiences, most notably at TED 2013 and on The Charlie Rose Show.

Work

Books
McAfee's first book, Enterprise 2.0: New Collaborative Tools for Your Organization's Toughest Challenges, brings together case studies and examples with key concepts from economics, sociology, computer science, consumer psychology, and management studies of how leading organizations are incorporating the web's novel tools and philosophies.

His second book, Race Against the Machine: How the Digital Revolution is Accelerating Innovation, Driving Productivity, and Irreversibly Transforming Employment and the Economy, co-authored with Erik Brynjolfsson, brings together a range of data, examples, and research to show that the average US worker is being left behind by advances in technology.

In September 2014, he co-authored the book Leading Digital – Turning Technology into Business Transformation, with George Westermann (MIT) and Didier Bonnet (Capgemini Consulting).

In 2016 and 2018 McAfee cowrote two more books with Brynjolfsson, titled The Second Machine Age: Work, Progress, and Prosperity in a Time of Brilliant Technologies and Machine, Platform, Crowd: Harnessing Our Digital Future respectively.

In October 2019, Scribner published More from Less: The Surprising Story of How We Learned to Prosper Using Fewer Resources — and What Happens Next.

Bibliography
 Enterprise 2.0: New Collaborative Tools for Your Organization's Toughest Challenges (2009) 
 Race Against the Machine: How the Digital Revolution is Accelerating Innovation, Driving Productivity, and Irreversibly Transforming Employment and the Economy with Erik Brynjolfsson (2012) 
 Leading Digital: Turning Technology into Business Transformation with George Westermann (2014) 
 The Second Machine Age: Work, Progress, and Prosperity in a Time of Brilliant Technologies with Erik Brynjolfsson (2016) 
 Machine, Platform, Crowd: Harnessing Our Digital Future with Erik Brynjolfsson (2018) 
 More from Less: The Surprising Story of How We Learned to Prosper Using Fewer Resources — and What Happens Next (2019)

References

External links
 Personal website
 Twitter
 Harvard Business Review
 
 

1960s births
Living people
Harvard University alumni
MIT School of Engineering alumni
MIT Sloan School of Management alumni
MIT Sloan School of Management faculty